The Caruachi Dam is a concrete gravity dam on the Caroní River in Bolivar state, Venezuela. It supports a hydroelectric power facility with a  capacity.

The dam 
The first of the  Kaplan turbine-generators General Electric supplied for the project began commercial operation in April 2003; the 12th and final unit entered service on February 28, 2006, and entered into formal/fully commercial operation on 31 March 2006, when the project was officially inaugurated.

The total installed capacity is 2,160 MW and the power plant will produce about 12 TW·h annually.

This project is formed jointly with the Central Hidroeléctrica Simón Bolívar in Guri, Antonio José de Sucre in Macagua and Manuel Piar in Tocoma (under construction), the development of Lower Caroní River hydroelectric resources and one of the world's largest hydro projects now in construction, that, when completed, EDELCA (Electrificación del Caroní CA) claims will save Venezuela the equivalent of 750,000 barrels of oil per day, compared to 300,000 currently.

Design and construction 
The contract for the design, supply and installation of the main electro-mechanical equipment was awarded to a consortium of Kvaerner of Norway, GE Energy of the USA, and Elin Transformatoren GmbH of Austria. Major work began on the project in 1998.

Following GE's acquisition of Kvaerner's hydro business in 1999, over 90% of the Caruachi contract was carried out by GE Hydro, including all aspects of the design, supply and installation of the turbines, generators, governors, exciters and cranes. A total of 12 Kaplan turbine-generator units, each capable of a power output of 180 MW, were supplied to the project.

ABB of Switzerland won three contracts to provide the power transmission system for the project. A 400 kV substation and four related 400 kV transmission lines connect the plant with the country's transmission network.

Alstom Power was awarded the contract for distributed control system and SCADA, and small electrical auxiliaries like UPS equipments and DC distribution boards.

The original GE Hydro and Elin contracts were, through several mergers and acquisitions, transferred to the 2005-created Andritz Hydro of Austria. While the original Alstom contract was in 2014 inherited by a new GE Renewable Energy entity.

Features 

A 900 m right-abutment rockfill closure dam has a concrete slab face and a maximum height of 50 m, and a 4,200 m left-abutment earth and rockfill closure dam has a maximum height of 45 m.

A spillway with nine spans and radial surface gates has an aggregate  flow capacity.

Two transition dams have a  intermediate buttress between the powerhouse and spillway.

See also 

 List of conventional hydroelectric power stations

References

External links 
 Official site of EDELCA and the Caruachi Project
 Caruachi Hydroelectric Power Plant, Venezuela from the Web Site of the Power Industry

Dams completed in 2006
Energy infrastructure completed in 2006
Dams in Venezuela
Hydroelectric power stations in Venezuela
Gravity dams
Buildings and structures in Bolívar (state)